Warriors is the second and last studio album by Yugoslav/Canadian heavy metal band Warriors, released in 1984. It is the band's second self-titled album, after their first studio album, released in 1983.

Background
After the release of their first album, Warriors moved from Belgrade, Yugoslavia to Toronto, Canada, home country of their guitarist Douglass Platt. In Toronto they were joined by drummer Lawrence Gretsch, formerly of Frank Soda & The Imps. The band signed for Canadian record label Attic Records and in 1984 recorded their second self-titled album. After the album release, the band went on a short tour with Nazareth, disbanding shortly after.

Album cover
The album cover, designed by Zoran Blažina, was, with a different Warriors logo, originally used as the cover for the band's debut release, the EP Warriors – Ratnici, released in 1983.

Track listing
All songs credited to Dušan Nikolić, Douglas Platt, Zoran Konjević and Slobodan Svrdlan

Personnel
Dušan Nikolić - vocals
Douglas Platt - guitar, backing vocals
Zoran Konjević - guitar, backing vocals
Slobodan Svrdlan - bass guitar, backing vocals
Lawrence Gretsch - drums

Additional personnel
Fraser Hill - producer
Rick Hutt - producer, arrangements
Dan Baker - recording
Paul Shubat - recording
Vic Pyle - recording
 Dave Dixon - recording
Ed Stone - recording
Noel Golden - recording
Michael Wagener - mixing
Walter Zwol - mixing
Wyn Davis - mixing assistant
Zoran Blažina - artwork
Patrick Harbron - photography
Dean Motter - design

References

Warriors at Discogs

External links
Warriors at Discogs

Warriors (band) albums
1984 albums